Zhao Ming may refer to:

 Xiao Tong (萧统), formally Crown Prince Zhao Ming (昭明太子), son of Emperor Wu of the Liang Dynasty (502-577) compiler of the Zhao Ming essays, the first anthology of essays in China
 Zhao Ming, film director; director of The Adventures of Sanmao the Waif (1949)
 Zhao Ming (footballer, born 1984) (赵铭 born 1984), Chinese football player
 Zhao Ming (footballer, born 1987) (赵铭 born 1987), Chinese football player
 Zhao Ming (actress) (赵铭 1987), Chinese actress who appears in the film Let the Bullets Fly 2010